Bernardino Pérez Maza, commonly known as Berdi Pérez, is a retired professional basketball player. He is currently the General Manager of Real Betis Baloncesto of the Spanish Liga ACB. He played for C.B. Gran Canaria in the late 1980s and was appointed as the General Manager on June 6, 2012.

References

Living people
Spanish men's basketball players
Year of birth missing (living people)
Place of birth missing (living people)